Egnatia, Byzacena is an ancient civitas of the Roman Province of Byzacena in North Africa. The exact location of the town is not known, but was in the Sahel region of Tunisia.
The town was in ancient times the seat of an ancient Roman Catholic bishopric. Today the bishopric survives as a titular Bishopric and the current bishop of the town is Dionisio Lachovicz.

References

Former Roman Catholic dioceses in Africa
Roman towns and cities in Tunisia
Ancient Berber cities
Catholic titular sees in Africa